Tania Vicenzino (born 1 April 1986, in Palmanova) is an Italian long jumper. In the season 2018-2019 and 2019-2020 she also competed as bobsledder also at the IBSF World Championships 2020.

Biography

In her career she won the national championships twelve times. She is engaged to the discus thrower Hannes Kirchler.

Progression

Achievements

Crash
2020 Altenberg Germany

National titles
Italian Athletics Championships 
Long jump: 2007, 2008, 2009, 2010, 2011, 2012, 2013, 2014, 2019 (9 wins)
Italian Athletics Indoor Championships 
Long jump: 2009, 2018, 2019 (3 wins)

See also
Italian all-time lists - Long jump
List of multi-sport athletes

References

External links
 
 
 Tania Vicenzino at FIDAL 
 

1986 births
Living people
Italian female long jumpers
People from Palmanova
Mediterranean Games gold medalists for Italy
Mediterranean Games bronze medalists for Italy
Athletes (track and field) at the 2009 Mediterranean Games
Athletes (track and field) at the 2013 Mediterranean Games
Athletes (track and field) at the 2018 Mediterranean Games
Italian female bobsledders
Mediterranean Games medalists in athletics
Italian Athletics Championships winners
Sportspeople from Udine